The Mr. Australia contest, now known as the Australian Championships, is a bodybuilding contest for men and women organised by WFF Australia. It includes fitness, figure, bikini and sports model competitions. The Australian Championships is a National Qualifier for major international events.

Beginning in 1947, the Mr. Australia contest was staged haphazardly by various individual promoters. It did not become a regular annual event until 1958. The early contests were not officially associated with any bodybuilding organisation however promoters in each state or territory were mindful not to promote more than one Mr Australia nationally and so shared the contest between them.

Winners 
This is a list of overall Amateur Mr. Australia champions:

Committee
Within Australia, competitions are governed in each separate state or territory by a state association, all affiliated to the national governing organisation.

See also

Bodybuilding in Australia
National Amateur Body-Builders' Association
World Fitness Federation
List of professional bodybuilding competitions

References

External links
 www.nabbawff.com.au

|}

Bodybuilding competitions in Australia
Recurring sporting events established in 1947
1947 establishments in Australia